Nora Chesson (2 January 1871 – 14 April 1906) was an English journalist and poet. She won for herself a distinct celebrity as a contributor to most of the English periodicals and newspapers of her time.

Biography
Eleanor Jane Hopper was born in Exeter, 2 January 1871. Her father, Capt. Harman Baillie Hopper, was Irish. She was a participant in the Irish literary movement of the 1890s, having some influence on W. B. Yeats in particular with her Ballads in Prose (1894).

Her career as an authoress in poetry and in prose began in 1887, when she was not quite seventeen years of age, and she went on increasing her literary reputation until her death. Over some of her poems there was an atmosphere of melancholy which might seem as if it cast upon them the shadow of a too early death. She provided the English translation to Thadgh O'Donoghue's libretto for the Irish opera Muirgheis (1903) by Thomas O'Brien Butler (1861–1915).

In 1901, she married the English man of letters Wilfrid Hugh Chesson (1870–1953). She died 14 April 1906. Five volumes of her selected poems were published that year by Alston Rivers, of London, which included a short biographical note by the editor, her husband, and an introductory appreciation by Ford Madox Hueffer.

References

Bibliography

External links

 
 Warwick Gould, ‘Hopper , Eleanor Jane (1871–1906)’, in: Oxford Dictionary of National Biography (print issue: Oxford: Oxford University Press, 2004), retrieved 2 January 2008.
 

1871 births
1906 deaths
English women poets
19th-century English poets
19th-century English women writers
19th-century English writers